The Dumas method in analytical chemistry is a method for the quantitative determination of nitrogen in chemical substances  based on a method first described by Jean-Baptiste Dumas in 1826.

The Dumas technique has been automated and instrumentalized, so that it is capable of rapidly measuring the crude protein concentration of food samples. This automatic Dumas technique has replaced the Kjeldahl method as the standard method of analysis for nutritional labelling of protein content of foods (except in high fat content foods where the Kjeldahl method is still preferred due to fire risks).

Method 
The method consists of combusting a sample of known mass to a temperature between 800 and 900 °C in the presence of oxygen. This leads to the release of carbon dioxide, water and nitrogen. The gases are then passed over special columns (such as potassium hydroxide aqueous solution) that absorb the carbon dioxide and water. A column containing a thermal conductivity detector at the end is then used to separate the nitrogen from any residual carbon dioxide and water and the remaining nitrogen content is measured. The instrument must first be calibrated by analyzing a material that is pure and has a known nitrogen concentration. The measured signal from the thermal conductivity detector for the unknown sample can then be converted into a nitrogen content. As with the Kjeldahl method, conversion of the concentration of nitrogen in a sample to the crude protein content is performed using conversion factors which depend on the particular amino acid sequence of the measured protein.

Advantages and limitations 
The Dumas method has the advantages of being easy to use and fully automatable. It has been developed into a considerably faster method than the Kjeldahl method, and can take a few minutes per measurement, as compared to the hour or more for Kjeldahl. It also does not make use of toxic chemicals or catalysts. One major disadvantage is its high initial cost, although new technology developments are reducing this drawback. Also, as with Kjeldahl, it does not give a measure of true protein, as it registers non-protein nitrogen, and different correction factors are needed for different proteins because they have different amino acid sequences.

See also
Combustion analysis, a similar approach to Dumas but involving carbon, hydrogen, and nitrogen as well
Kjeldahl method, another nitrogen analysis method
Bicinchoninic acid assay, a colorimetric assay for protein-nitrogen

References

Chemical tests
Nitrogen